The 7-16 DIN connector or 7/16 (seven and sixteen millimeter DIN) is a 50 Ω threaded RF connector used to join coaxial cables. It was designed to reduce passive intermodulation from multiple transmitters. It is among the most widely used high power RF connectors in cellular network antenna systems. Originally popular in Europe, it has gained widespread use in the US and elsewhere. 

It is not to be confused with the similar-sounding EIA flanged RF connectors which are referred to by the outer diameter in fractions of an inch.

The 7–16 DIN connector is also defined by an international standard, IEC 61169-4. It out performs other non-flange options, such as N connectors or BNC connectors, when it comes to interference and intermodulation rejection or higher power handling at RF frequencies.

7-16 DIN is a high power RF connector widely used in antenna systems or base stations that supplies better performances concerning interference and intermodulation rejection. The inner contact on the 7-16 DIN connector measures 7 mm while the outer contact on the connector measures 16 mm.

DIN is an acronym for the Deutsches Institut für Normung, the standards organization that harmonized the standard for the connector. (Previously the 7-16 had been developed as a military 'special' and made by Spinner and others.)
The 7-16 is a reference to the 7-millimeter outer diameter of the female inner contact and the corresponding 16-millimeter inner diameter of the outer contact. The external thread is 29 mm, 1.5 mm pitch.

As with all RF connectors the safe power handling is determined by the heating and subsequent oxidation of the centre 'pin' for continuous operation at high frequencies, and by voltage breakdown between inner and outer conductors at lower frequencies, or short pulse operation, and for reliable high power operation, connectors must be assembled with careful attention to cleanliness and alignment. In practice the power handling curve is a complex function of frequency, and extrapolating from spot frequency figures can be misleading, if in doubt the maker's data should always be consulted.

There are larger connectors in the same family; the 13-30 DIN (external thread 50 mm, 3 mm pitch) and the (rare) 25-58 DIN permitting progressively higher power handling still (approximately twice and four times respectively), but as the cables to suit these connectors are rare, neither connector is yet to gain the same near-universal popularity as the 7-16 DIN, and these still remain unseen outside the domain of a few speciality broadcast equipment manufacturers.

Usage 
According to the Utilities Telecom Council journal,

7/16 DIN connectors are used in antenna systems where there are multiple transmitters using the same antenna or where a base station antenna is co-located with a large number of other transmitting antennas... These connectors produce lower inter-modulation distortion products and thus are specified at busy RF sites and in almost all trunking systems where multiple transmitters share a common antenna. Note that an antenna rated for low passive inter-modulation (PIM) performance must be used along with these connectors. It defeats the purpose of designing a low PIM antenna system if regular N connectors or a non-PIM rated antenna are used.

See also 
 List of RF connector types
 N connector
 BNC connector
 TNC connector
 EEG DIN connector

References 

RF connectors